Edward Nichols House, also known as Hillcrest, is a historic home located at Leesburg, Loudoun County, Virginia.  It was built in 1899, and is a -story, irregularly shaped, beige brick dwelling with Queen Anne and Colonial Revival style decorative details. It has a tall hipped roof, two-story rear ell, and features projecting two-story bay windows topped with gables on the front and east elevations.  Also on the property are the contributing laundry, carriage house / barn with attached water tower, and storage shed.

It was listed on the National Register of Historic Places in 1987.

References

Houses on the National Register of Historic Places in Virginia
Queen Anne architecture in Virginia
Colonial Revival architecture in Virginia
Houses completed in 1899
Houses in Loudoun County, Virginia
National Register of Historic Places in Loudoun County, Virginia
Leesburg, Virginia